An anagram is a word or phrase formed by rearranging the letters of another word or phrase.

Anagram or Anagrams may also refer to:
 Anagram (band), Canadian punk rock band
 Anagram Islands off Antarctica
 Operation Anagram, British police investigation into serial killer Peter Tobin
 Anagrams (game), a word game
 Anagram Sweden, film company that produced Thin Blue Line (Swedish TV series)